Han Jin-hee (born March 14, 1949) is a South Korean actor. He made his acting debut in 1969 and has remained active in television and film.

In 1990 he served as president of the TV Broadcasting Actors Association.

Filmography

Film

My Little Bride (2004)
My Sassy Girl (2001)
You Are My Ecstatic Hell (1990)
Hwa-chun  (1989)
A Forest Where a Woman Breathes (1988)
Frozen Sea (1987)
Saturdays with No Nights (1986)
The Revolt of Women (1985)
My Love 3 (1985)
The Winter That Year Was Warm (1984)
Ban-no 2  (1984)
Wife (1983)
My Love 2 (1983)
The Man Made to Cry by a Woman (1981)
Freezing Point '81 (1981)
The One I Love (1981)
The Woman Outside the Window (1980)
A Rose with Thorns (1979)
The Trappings of Youth (1979)
Portrait of a Rock  (1979)
Flame Sonata  (1979)
Byung-tae and Young-ja (1979)
Climax (1978)
Miss O's Apartment (1978)
Sons for My Wife (1977)
Target (1977)
Cold-Hearted Days (1976)
Excellent Guys (1974)

Television series

Record of Youth (tvn, 2020) 
Never Twice (MBC, 2019–2020)
Tomorrow Victory (MBC, 2015–2016)
Remember (SBS, 2015–2016)
Birth of a Beauty (SBS, 2014)
Apgujeong Midnight Sun (MBC, 2014)
High School King of Savvy (tvN, 2014)
Jang Bo-ri is Here! (MBC, 2014)
Thrice Married Woman (SBS, 2013)
Two Women's Room (SBS, 2013)
Pots of Gold (MBC, 2013)
Cheongdam-dong Alice (SBS, 2012)
Here Comes Mr. Oh (MBC, 2012)
Missing You (MBC, 2012)
Childless Comfort (jTBC, 2012)
You're Here, You're Here, You're Really Here (MBN, 2011)
Bride of the Sun (SBS, 2011)
The Greatest Love (MBC, 2011)
New Tales of Gisaeng (SBS, 2011)
The King of Legend (KBS1, 2010)
Gloria (MBC, 2010)
Life Is Beautiful (SBS, 2010)
Temptation of an Angel (SBS, 2009)
Assorted Gems (MBC, 2009)
Green Coach (SBS, 2009)
The Road Home (KBS2, 2009)
The Kingdom of the Winds (KBS2, 2008)
Aeja's Older Sister, Minja (SBS, 2008)
Even So Love (MBC, 2007)
First Wives' Club (SBS, 2007)
Heaven & Earth (KBS1, 2007)
Queen of the Game (SBS, 2006)
Sunok (KBS1, 2006)
Hearts of Nineteen (KBS1, 2006)
End of Love (MBC, 2006)
Autumn Shower (MBC, 2005)
Goodbye to Sadness (KBS2, 2005)
Green Rose (SBS, 2005)
Lotus Flower Fairy (MBC, 2004)
Island Village Teacher (SBS, 2004)
Terms of Endearment (KBS2, 2004)
One Million Roses (KBS1, 2003)
Rose Fence (KBS2, 2003)
On the Green Prairie (KBS2, 2003)
To Be With You (KBS1, 2002)
Golden Carriage (MBC, 2002)
Who's My Love (KBS2, 2002)
We Are Dating Now (SBS, 2002)
Mina (KBS2, 2001)
This Is Love (KBS1, 2001)
Rules of Marriage (MBC, 2001)
Hotelier (MBC, 2001)
Stock Flower (KBS2, 2001)
Flower Garden (KBS2, 2001)
Foolish Love (KBS2, 2000)
사랑할수록 (MBC, 2000)
The Aspen Tree (SBS, 2000)
Did You Ever Love? (KBS2, 1999)
Beautiful Choice (MBC, 1999)
Who Are You (SBS, 1999)
My Love by My Side (KBS1, 1998)
I Love You, I'm Sorry (KBS2, 1998)
Legend of Ambition (KBS2, 1998)
Lie (KBS2, 1998)
I Love You! I Love You! (SBS, 1998)
Miari No. 1 (SBS, 1997)
Because I Love You (SBS, 1997)
Happiness Is in Our Hearts (SBS, 1997)
Propose (KBS2, 1997)
A Bluebird Has It (KBS2, 1997)
Dad Is the Boss (SBS, 1996)
Power of Love (MBC, 1996)
Sometimes Like Strangers (SBS, 1996)
Mornings at a Park in Paris (KBS2, 1996)
이혼하지 않는 이유 (MBC, 1996)
Your Voice (SBS, 1995)
Even if the Wind Blows (KBS1, 1995)
Matsu (MBC, 1994)
Farewell (SBS, 1994)
Love and Farewell (KBS2, 1993)
대리인 (KBS1, 1992)
And Shaky Times (KBS2, 1991)
The Love Song of Lethe (KBS2, 1991)
Beyond the Mountains (MBC, 1991)
Mongshil (MBC, 1990)
우리가 사랑하는 죄인 (KBS2, 1990)
Tree Blooming with Love (KBS2, 1990)
Copper Ring (KBS2, 1990)
Endless Love (KBS2, 1989)
절반의 실패 (KBS2, 1989)
The 5th Row (MBC, 1989)
The 7th Ward (KBS2, 1988)
타인 (KBS2, 1987)
세월 (KBS1, 1987)
길손 (KBS2, 1986)
My Heart Is Like a Star (KBS2, 1986)
Stars on the Prairie (KBS2, 1986)
The Youth (KBS2, 1985)
객사 (KBS2, 1984)
Family (KBS2, 1984)
Burning Sea (KBS1, 1984)
A Twist on the Tale of Chunhyang (KBS2, 1984)
엄마는 바빠요 (KBS2, 1983)
Thaw (KBS2, 1983)
천생연분 (KBS2, 1982)
환상의 공포 (KBS2, 1981)
언약 (TBC, 1977)
Wedding March (TBC, 1976)
맏며느리 (TBC, 1976)
옥피리 (TBC, 1975)
Mihwa (TBC, 1975)
Detective (TBC, 1975)
Mother (TBC, 1974)

Theater
Love Letters (2006)

Radio program
Music Album (KBS Cool FM)

Awards
2013 MBC Drama Awards: Lifetime Achievement Award (Pots of Gold) 
2006 8th KBS Right Language Awards: Special Award
1979 Theater, Film and TV Arts Awards: Popularity Award
1977 13th Baeksang Arts Awards: Best Actor (Daughter-in-law)
1976 TBC Drama Awards
1975 TBC Drama Awards

References

External links

1949 births
Living people
South Korean male film actors
South Korean male television actors